

Scott Maxwell (born January 20, 1964), is a Canadian auto racing driver.

Scott has competed and won titles in Formula Vee (1984), Formula Ford 1600 (1985 and 1986), Canadian National Showroom Stock (1992 and 1993) and Grand-Am/Continental Tire SportsCar Challenge GS (2002 and 2008, 2016). He also contested the Canadian GM Challenge, Porsche Carrera Cup and Pro Formula Ford 2000 series from 1986 through 1990. He made a single Indy Lights start in 1992.

One of the highlights of Maxwell's career came in 2000 at the 24 Hours of Le Mans when he won the LMP 675 class for Multimatic Motorsports aboard a Nissan-powered Lola with fellow Canadians John Graham and Greg Wilkins.

In 2003, Scott Maxwell along with David Empringham and David Brabham won the first ever Daytona Prototype race at the Rolex 24 Hours of Daytona. However, The Racer's Group GT-class Porsche 911 won overall honors in that race. He also contested the American Le Mans Series with Panoz in 2003 and Krohn-Barbour Racing (Lamborghini) in 2004 as well as contesting several Rolex Sports Car Series events for Multimatic Daytona Prototype customers.  2003 was to also see Maxwell make his NASCAR Winston Cup Series debut, but he failed to qualify the #43 car for Petty Enterprises at Watkins Glen International.

The Canadian co-drove with Grand Am Cup Champion David Empringham in 2005 aboard a Multimatic Motorsports entered factory Ford Mustang FR500C. Maxwell missed out on sharing the title because he skipped one race to compete at Le Mans for Panoz Motor Sports.

In 2006, Maxwell clinched another milestone victory for Multimatic Motorsports when he teamed with David Brabham and Sébastien Bourdais to win the GT2 class at the 2006 12 Hours of Sebring. In 2008 he won the Grand American Road Racing KONI Sports Car Challenge driver's championship with partner Joe Foster aboard the Hypersports Mustang FR500C run in cooperation with Multimatic Motorsports. Maxwell clinched the 2016 Continental Tire SportsCar Challenge GS championship co-driving with Billy Johnson in the Ford Performance Shelby GT350R-C.

Maxwell drove for Multimatic Motorsports with Sebastian Priaulx in a Ford Mustang in the GT4 class in the 2019 British GT Championship. They were in contention for the class title but missed out by just 8.5 points from Tom Canning and Ash Hand, despite finishing ahead of their rivals in the finale.

Motorsports career results

NASCAR
(key) (Bold - Pole position awarded by qualifying time. Italics - Pole position earned by points standings or practice time. * – Most laps led.)

Winston Cup Series

24 Hours of Le Mans results

Complete British GT Championship results
(key) (Races in bold indicate pole position) (Races in italics indicate fastest lap)

References

External links
Multimatic Motorsports official website

Living people
1964 births
Sportspeople from Toronto
Racing drivers from Ontario
24 Hours of Le Mans drivers
24 Hours of Daytona drivers
American Le Mans Series drivers
Rolex Sports Car Series drivers
Indy Lights drivers
British GT Championship drivers
Multimatic Motorsports drivers
Michelin Pilot Challenge drivers
GT4 European Series drivers